Jessica Helleberg (born 20 February 1986) is a Swedish handball player, playing for the club København Håndbold and for the Swedish women's national handball team.

At the 2010 European Women's Handball Championship she reached the final and won a silver medal with the Swedish team.

References

External links

1986 births
Living people
Swedish female handball players
People from Partille Municipality
Sportspeople from Västra Götaland County
21st-century Swedish women